Daphnella ticaonica is a species of sea snail, a marine gastropod mollusk in the family Raphitomidae.

Description
The length of the shell attains 12 mm.

The whorls are rather ventricose and spirally irregularly ridged. The interstices between the ridges are very minutely latticed. The sinus is small. The color of the shell is whitish, flamed here and there with orange-brown.

Distribution
This marine species occurs off the Philippines.

References

 Reeve, L.A. 1845. Monograph of the genus Pleurotoma. pls 20-33 in Reeve, L.A. (ed). Conchologia Iconica. London : L. Reeve & Co. Vol. 1.

External links
 

ticaonica
Gastropods described in 1845